Anthophila latarniki is a moth in the family Choreutidae. It was described by Christian Guillermet in 2010. It is found on Réunion.

References

Choreutidae
Moths described in 2010